Rahila Bibi Kobra Alamshahi was elected to represent Ghazni Province in Afghanistan's Wolesi Jirga, the lower house of its National Legislature, in 2005.
She is a member of the Hazara ethnic group. She is a teacher and journalist. She lived as a refugee in Iran for 28 years.

See also 
 List of Hazara people

References 

Living people
Hazara politicians
Politicians of Ghazni Province
Members of the House of the People (Afghanistan)
Afghan expatriates in Iran
21st-century Afghan women politicians#
Year of birth missing (living people)
21st-century Afghan politicians